This list is of the Cultural Properties of Japan designated in the category of  for the Prefecture of Mie.

National Cultural Properties
As of 1 July 2020, four Important Cultural Properties have been designated, being of national significance.

Prefectural Cultural Properties
As of 1 February 2017, ten properties have been designated at a prefectural level.

See also
 Cultural Properties of Japan
 List of National Treasures of Japan (historical materials)
 List of Cultural Properties of Japan - paintings (Mie)
 List of Historic Sites of Japan (Mie)
 Ise, Shima, Iga, Kii Provinces

References

External links
  Cultural Properties in Mie Prefecture

Cultural Properties,historical materials
Historical materials,Mie